America – Do You Remember the Love? is an album by American guitarist James Blood Ulmer recorded in 1987 and released on the Blue Note label. It was Ulmer's only album recorded for the label.

Reception
The Allmusic review by Brian Olewnick awarded the album 4 stars, and states, "The album ends up sounding polished but not slick, each composition standing solidly and offering varied pleasures. Different from Odyssey but situated alongside it as one of Ulmer's best".

Track listing
All compositions by James Blood Ulmer
 "I Belong in the U.S.A." - 6:40      
 "Lady Blue" - 6:17     
 "After Dark" - 6:18     
 "Show Me Your Love, America" - 7:24      
 "Black Sheep" - 3:44     
 "Wings" - 5:31
Recorded at the Power Station, Quadrosonic and RPM, New York City in 1987

Personnel
James "Blood" Ulmer - guitar, vocals
Bill Laswell - 4, 6 & 8 string basses
Nicky Skopelitis - 12 string guitar, banjo
Ronald Shannon Jackson - drums
Bernard Fowler, Fred Fowler, Muriel Fowler - backing vocals

References

Blue Note Records albums
James Blood Ulmer albums
1987 albums